Pump Up the Volume (Music From the Original Motion Picture Soundtrack) is the soundtrack to Allan Moyle's 1990 comedy-drama film Pump Up the Volume. It was released on August 14, 1990 through MCA Records. The album peaked at number 50 on the US Billboard 200 chart.

Music being central to the plot of a film about a young pirate radio station DJ, the soundtrack featured a diverse number of artists. The official soundtrack release had eleven tracks.

Song information
The soundtrack features several covers. The Cowboy Junkies' contribution to the soundtrack is a remake of a Robert Johnson song, while the Bad Brains and Henry Rollins track is a cover of the MC5 anthem "Kick Out the Jams". "Stand" by Liquid Jesus is a new version of the 1969 song by Sly & the Family Stone.

Peter Murphy's exclusive track was later included on a special reissue of his 1988 album, Love Hysteria, while Sonic Youth's song appeared on their 1990 release, Goo.

An earlier version of Soundgarden's "Heretic" appears on the 1985 Seattle band compilation album Deep Six. Concrete Blonde revisited "Everybody Knows" on their 2003 album, Live in Brazil. The original, upbeat version of "Wave of Mutilation" appears on Doolittle, the third studio album by Pixies, while the UK Surf version was a B-side for a single from the album, "Here Comes Your Man".

A number of songs prominently featured in the film did not appear on the officially released soundtrack, including the original version of "Everybody Knows" by Leonard Cohen, which appeared on his 1988 album, I'm Your Man. Although Cohen's version serves as the theme song for Mark's (Christian Slater) pirate radio program during most of the film, he opens his final broadcast with the Concrete Blonde cover that appears on the soundtrack. Another Cohen song appears briefly when Mark is talking about Malcom's suicide on the air. The song is "If It Be Your Will" from Cohen's 1984 release Various Positions. Also present in the film but absent from the soundtrack are "Hello, Dad, I'm in Jail" by Was (Not Was) from their 1988 album What Up, Dog?, "Fast Lane" by Urban Dance Squad from their 1990 album Mental Floss for the Globe, "Weinerschnitzel" by The Descendents from their 1981 EP Fat, "Love Comes in Spurts" by Richard Hell and the Voidoids from their 1977 album Blank Generation, and "Talk Hard" by Stan Ridgway, the original version of which has never been released (though Ridgway has released a live version of the song). "Girls L.G.B.N.A.F." by Ice-T is played on a boombox outside of the school by some boys.

Not as prominently featured is a legendary early track by the Beastie Boys entitled "The Scenario". Although the song appears only briefly in Pump Up the Volume, it is notable because it never appeared in any official release, however is available on hard to find bootleg recordings. The song was cut from the Beastie's Def Jam album Licensed to Ill after being deemed too explicit. Christian Slater's character explains this when he introduces it on the air saying, "Now here's a song from my close personal buddies, the Beastie Boys...a song that was so controversial they couldn't put it on their first album".

Track listing

Other songs in the film

Chart history

Certifications

References

External links 
 

1990 soundtrack albums
Comedy-drama film soundtracks
MCA Records soundtracks
Albums produced by Laylaw
Albums produced by Dennis Herring
Albums produced by Ron Saint Germain